

The Swiss Poster Collection is a Swiss archive which, in a joint effort with various Swiss libraries and museums, offers access to digitized posters covering “a time span from the second half of the 19th century to the present”.

Currently, the posters come from the Swiss National Library, university libraries or libraries in the cantons of Fribourg, Geneva, Neuchâtel, Vaud and Valais, the Swiss Museum of Transport, the St. Maurice's Abbey as well as the Swiss Film Archive.

Literature
 Bruno Margadant. The Swiss poster: 1900–1983. Basel: Birkhäuser, 1983.
 Willy Rotzler. Das Plakat in der Schweiz: mit 376 Kurzbiographien von Plakatgestalterinnen und Plakatgestaltern. Schaffhausen: Stemmle, 1990.
 50 years Swiss posters selected by the Federal department of home affairs: 1941–1990. Genève: Société générale d'affichage / Bern: Kümmerly + Frey, 1991.
 Schweizer Plakate des Jahres ... ausgezeichnet vom Eidgenössischen Departement des Innern. Genève: Société générale d'affichage, 1976–1999

See also
 Swiss National Library
 Federal Archives of Switzerland
 Swiss Film Archive

References

External links
 Swiss Poster Collection website
 Association Collections Suisses des Affiches CSA
 HelveticAll provides access to the resources of the Swiss National Library’s principal catalogues
 Swiss National Library website

Year of establishment missing
Archives in Switzerland
Collections of museums in Switzerland
Online archives